Zhu Lizhong (born 19 October 1959) is a Chinese environmental engineer who is a professor at Zhejiang University, and an academician of the Chinese Academy of Engineering.

Biography 
Zhu was born in Shangyu County, Zhejiang, on 19 October 1959. He secondary studied at Lihai High School and Chunhui High School. In 1978, he was admitted to Hangzhou University (now Zhejiang University), majoring in chemistry. 

He joined the Communist Party of China in April 1985. In September 1990, he went to study at the University of British Columbia in Canada. In September 1996, he was hired by the University of Shizuoka as a guest professor. In December 2000, he became a visiting scholar at the United States Geological Survey, a position in which he remained until March 2001. He was honored as a Distinguished Young Scholar by the National Science Fund for Distinguished Young Scholars in 2001. In 2006, he joined the faculty of Zhejiang University.

Honours and awards 
 2007 State Science and Technology Progress Award (Second Class) 
 2013 State Natural Science Award (Second Class)
 2015 Member of the Royal Society of Chemistry
 27 November 2017 Member of the Chinese Academy of Engineering (CAE)

References 

1959 births
Living people
People from Shaoxing
Engineers from Zhejiang
Zhejiang University alumni
Academic staff of Zhejiang University
Members of the Chinese Academy of Engineering